Aviv Volnerman ( (born July 18, 1980) is an Israeli soccer player currently playing for Newark Ironbound Express in the USL Premier Development League.

Career

Club
Volnerman made his league debut in a match against Maccabi Jaffa. After not receiving much playing time at Maccabi Netanya, Volnerman left the club to join Liga Leumit side Hapoel Ramat Gan. In his second season at the club, Ramat Gan won the State Cup and a place in the UEFA Cup. Volnerman played in Ramat Gan's two UEFA Cup matches against PFC Levski Sofia.

After leaving Israel, Volnerman took up coaching and became the coach of the varsity and junior varsity football teams at Ma'ayanot Yeshiva High School in Teaneck, New Jersey.

International
Volnerman made one appearance for the Israel national under-21 football team in 2001 in a friendly against the Greece national under-21 football team at Bloomfield Stadium in Tel Aviv, Israel.

Statistics

Honours
 With Hapoel Tel Aviv:
 Israeli Premier League (1): 1999-00
 State Cup (2): 1999, 2000
 With Hapoel Ramat Gan:
 State Cup (1): 2003

External links

References 

1980 births
Living people
Israeli footballers
Hapoel Tel Aviv F.C. players
Israel under-21 international footballers
Maccabi Netanya F.C. players
Hapoel Ramat Gan F.C. players
Hapoel Herzliya F.C. players
Jersey Express S.C. players
USL League Two players
Israeli expatriate footballers
Expatriate soccer players in the United States
Israeli expatriate sportspeople in the United States
Association football forwards